The Transpadane Republic was a revolutionary, provisional and internationally unrecognized government established in Milan by General Napoleon Bonaparte.

History
On 10 May 1796, the French army defeated the Austrian troops in the Battle of Lodi, and occupied the ancient Duchy of Milan. Napoleon set up a temporary authority, the General Administration of Lombardy, which replaced the Austrian officials and created a French client republic in Northern Italy, adopting the French Republican Calendar.

The Administration was granted full civil powers by a proclamation of Napoleon on Brumaire 8, year V (29 October 1796), even if its orders had to be approved by the French military commander of Lombardy. The Administration was composed of four departments: one for religious and cultural affairs, one for transportation and engineering affairs, one for financial and tax affairs, and one for mercantile and commercial affairs.

After the new victories of Napoleon's army, the territory of the republic grew; with the Preliminars of Leoben of 17 April 1797, France began the occupation of the Most Serene Republic of Venice, conquering Bergamo and moving eastwards from the Adda River to the Oglio River, the demarcation line with the Venetian territories established more than three centuries earlier. On 19 May, Napoleon transferred to Milan the territories of the former Duchy of Modena from the bordering Cispadane Republic. On 29 June, the General decided to give to the republic a final arrangement and a pro forma independence: by his own decree, he proclaimed the birth of the Cisalpine Republic.

Sources
Historical database of Lombard laws 

1796 in Italy
1797 in Italy
Modern history of Italy
Client states of the Napoleonic Wars
Italian states
Former republics
States and territories established in 1796
States and territories disestablished in 1797
1796 establishments in Europe
1797 disestablishments in Europe